Butter 08 was a short-lived musical side-project whose members consisted of Yuka Honda and Miho Hatori of Cibo Matto, Russell Simins of the Jon Spencer Blues Explosion, Rick Lee of Skeleton Key and director Mike Mills. The band released just one album, the self-titled Butter 08 in 1996 on Beastie Boys' now defunct Grand Royal record label. The album features guest performances by future Cibo Matto members Timo Ellis and Sean Lennon as well as a performance by filmmaker Evan Bernard who directed music videos for several Grand Royal artists as well as for Cibo Matto and the Jon Spencer Blues Explosion.

In addition to their one album, a remix of their song "Degobrah" appears on the soundtrack for City of Industry, a 1997 film featuring Harvey Keitel.

The band was formed allegedly when the members spent an evening recording the 1995 Cibo Matto single "Know Your Chicken" together. A demo was then sent to Mike D, who immediately signed Butter 08 to Grand Royal.

"Butter 08" Track Listing
"9MM"
"Shut Up"
"Butter Of '69"
"Dick Serious"
"How Do I Relax"
"It's The Rage" (featuring Sean Lennon on keyboards)
"Mono Lisa"
"What Are You Wearing"
"Sex Symbol"
"Degobrah" (featuring vocals by Evan Bernard)
"Hard To Hold"
"Butterfucker"

Link
Pop-Catastrophe.co.uk: Butter 08 discography

Musical groups from New York (state)
Musical groups established in 1995